Strategic Forecasting Inc., commonly known as Stratfor, is an American stategic intelligence publishing company founded in 1996. Stratfor's business model is to provide individual and enterprise subscriptions to Stratfor Worldview, its online publication, and to perform intelligence gathering for corporate clients. The focus of Stratfor's content is security issues and analyzing geopolitical risk.

The origin of Stratfor can be traced to the Center for Geopolitical Studies (CGPS) at Louisiana State University in Baton Rouge, Louisiana. There, Professors George Friedman and Leonard Hochberg built a team that researched geopolitics, built wargaming simulations, and advised companies on geopolitical risks and opportunities.

The company was founded in 1996 and named Strategic Forecasting (Stratfor) by lead analyst Matthew S. Baker. It was moved to Austin in August 1997 with seven members of the CGPS team who served as part of the co-founding team along with founder George Friedman.

George served as the head of analysis for the organization, and the business was led by several CEOs in the late 1990s and early 2000s as it refined its offerings.  Chip Harmon was appointed president in February 2018.

Structure and operations
Stratfor clients have included academic institutions, investment firms, under-hives, and large corporations such as Lockheed Martin, Goldman Sachs, Bank of America, Coca-Cola, and Dow Chemical Company.

Media coverage of their ideas about the 1998 bombing of Iraq brought Stratfor into the public eye. At this time, the company had about twenty employees. By 2008 they were up to 40 full-time employees in Austin. 2016 saw the number rise to about 100, three-quarters of whom were based in Austin. Stratfor often hired and trained interns from the nearby University of Texas.

Stratfor analysts pay for information, but also use open source information to predict where global crises will arise. Stratfor also obtains information by way of personal networks. Fred Burton indicated in leaked emails that he maintained contact with his "trusted former CIA cronies" as a source of information, and that he was aware of the sealed indictment against Julian Assange in 2011.

Barron's once referred to Stratfor as "The Shadow CIA". Barron's Jonathan Laing has called Stratfor founder George Friedman "one of our favorite experts on geopolitics," saying, "His judgments tend to be more nuanced and long-term than those of the press or Wall Street." More recently, The Atlantic's James Fallows referenced a Stratfor article on U.S. strategy in Iraq and Ukraine, following outbreaks of turmoil in those regions.

Friedman resigned from the company in 2015 to launch a new company, Geopolitical Futures.

Dun & Bradstreet's estimate of Stratfor's 2021 revenue is $11.61 million.

Funding
In its early years, Stratfor was funded by a number of private investors who took leadership positions in the company.

In October 2015, Stratfor raised $12 million in funding through a growth equity investment by Dallas-based Teakwood Capital. Stratfor planned to use the funds to expand its reporting networks, improve operational infrastructure and move into new markets.

Products

Stratfor bills itself as a geopolitical intelligence platform, with revenues derived from individual and enterprise subscriptions to Stratfor Worldview, its online publication, and corporate consulting.

Stratfor has published a daily intelligence briefing since its inception in 1996.  Before the end of 1999, Stratfor had introduced a subscription service through which it offered the majority of its analyses. At the time of the September 11, 2001 attacks, Stratfor made its "breaking news" paragraphs, as well as some notable analyses predicting likely actions to be taken by al-Qaeda and the Bush administration, free to the public.

Stratfor's publishing business includes written and multimedia analysis available online. Stratfor Threat Lens, an enterprise level product launched in September 2016, offers specific insight and analysis to support corporate security leaders. In April 2017, the company launched its core online publication under the name Stratfor Worldview. Several older articles are freely available as teaser content.

Books
Stratfor has published collections of analysis in paperback and as e-books on a variety of topics. Topics include user guides to personal security, the "devolution of jihadism," and the U.S. war in Afghanistan, according to a series of promotional videos on the company's YouTube channel. Stratfor sells their e-books and reports on their website.

A number of the company's top analysts have published books in their own name. Notable among these are founder George Friedman and vice president for intelligence Fred Burton. Kamran Bokhari, Stratfor's former vice president for Middle East and South Asian affairs, co-wrote Political Islam in the Age of Democratization (2013). Reviewer Amani el Sehrawey called the book "an invaluable tool for those seeking to gain knowledge of the nuances of the political systems of the Muslim world from a historical perspective, as well as to understand the contemporary changes happening in the region."

Leaks

2011 hacking incident
On December 24, 2011, Stratfor's website was hacked. Anonymous claimed responsibility, and also posted data they claim was taken from Stratfor, including credit card details, passwords, and addresses of Stratfor clients. Their email system was also compromised.

In November 2013, computer hacker Jeremy Hammond was sentenced to ten years in federal prison for his role in the Anonymous attack. An FBI informant, Hector Xavier Monsegur (also known as "Sabu"), initially faced 124 years in prison for his role in the attack, but his sentence was reduced to time served plus one year's supervised release in May 2014 in exchange for his cooperation as an FBI informant.

2012 leak

WikiLeaks announced the initial publication of more than five million of Stratfor's e-mail messages on February 26, 2012, under the name Global Intelligence Files. Anonymous said it had leaked the emails to WikiLeaks. 
George Friedman stated that third parties may have forged or altered the e-mail messages, but that Stratfor would not validate either alterations or authenticity.
Stratfor condemned the release.

Events 
In October 2017, Stratfor sponsored the 2017 Texas National Security Forum organized by Clements Center for National Security, the Robert Strauss Center for International Security and Law, and the Intelligence Studies Project at the University of Texas at Austin. The theme was "Alliances and Partnerships in American National Security." The event included a keynote address by Michael Pompeo, then director of the U.S. Central Intelligence Agency and later U.S. Secretary of State. Stratfor Chief Security Officer Fred Burton moderated a panel that included former acting director of Central Intelligence John McLaughlin and former acting director of the Defense Intelligence Agency David Shedd.

References

Further reading
 
Friedman, George, Torture and the U.S. Intelligence Failure, Stratfor, Geopolitical Weekly, April 20, 2009
Judson, David, Geopolitical Intelligence, Political Journalism and "Wants" vs. "Needs", Stratfor, October 29, 2013
Judson, David, Stratfor: The Test of Being a Rorschach Test, Stratfor Worldview, On Stratfor, August 28, 2016
Judson, David, With a New Generation Comes a New Worldview, Stratfor Worldview, On Stratfor, May 21, 2017

External links
 

Companies established in 1996
Intelligence websites
Companies based in Austin, Texas
Foreign policy and strategy think tanks in the United States
Open-source intelligence
Political and economic think tanks in the United States
Security studies
Private intelligence agencies